Dacre Hamilton Powell was Archdeacon of Cork  from 1899 until 1912.

Powell was born in Portarlington  and educated at Trinity College, Dublin. He was ordained in 1868 and began his career with a curacy  at Carrigaline. He also served at Fermoy, Cork, Macroom and Shandon.

References

Alumni of Trinity College Dublin
Archdeacons of Cork
People from Portarlington, County Laois
19th-century Irish Anglican priests
20th-century Irish Anglican priests